Deepstep is a town in Washington County, Georgia, United States. The population was 132 at the 2000 census.

History
A post office called Deepstep was established in 1886. The Georgia General Assembly incorporated the place in 1900 as the "Town of Deepstep". The town is named after Deepstep Creek.

Geography

Deepstep is located at  (33.021827, -82.968337).

Demographics

As of the census of 2000, there were 132 people, 54 households, and 40 families residing in the town. The racial makeup of the town was 100.00% White.

There were 54 households, out of which 37.0% had children under the age of 18 living with them, 72.2% were married couples living together, 3.7% had a female householder with no husband present, and 24.1% were non-families. 24.1% of all households were made up of individuals, and 16.7% had someone living alone who was 65 years of age or older. The average household size was 2.44 and the average family size was 2.90.

In the town, the population was spread out, with 21.2% under the age of 18, 4.5% from 18 to 24, 27.3% from 25 to 44, 26.5% from 45 to 64, and 20.5% who were 65 years of age or older. The median age was 42 years. For every 100 females, there were 103.1 males. For every 100 females age 18 and over, there were 100.0 males.

The median income for a household in the town was $44,583, and the median income for a family was $51,875. Males had a median income of $32,500 versus $25,000 for females. The per capita income for the town was $20,182. There were 4.9% of families and 3.3% of the population living below the poverty line, including no under eighteens and none of those over 64.

See also

 Central Savannah River Area

References

Towns in Georgia (U.S. state)
Towns in Washington County, Georgia